was a town located in Ōsato District, Saitama Prefecture, Japan.

As of 2004, the town had an estimated population of 12,740 and a density of 805.31 persons per km². The total area was 15.82 km².

On January 1, 2006, Hanazono, along with the towns of Kawamoto and Okabe (all from Ōsato District), was merged into the expanded city of Fukaya.

External links
 Official website of Fukaya 

Dissolved municipalities of Saitama Prefecture
Fukaya, Saitama